Pontibacter saemangeumensis  is a Gram-negative, rod-shaped and non-motile bacterium from the genus of Pontibacter which has been isolated from seawater from the Saemangeum Tidein Korea.

References

External links
Type strain of Pontibacter saemangeumensis at BacDive -  the Bacterial Diversity Metadatabase

Cytophagia
Bacteria described in 2013